Overture is a bestseller thriller–picaresque novel by Bosnian writer Zlatko Topčić, published in 2018.

It was presented at Bookstan, an international literary festival. Critics said that the novel is "great and multi-layered, bringing the story of art and suffering and their painful interwovenness".

Characters
Abdulah Veladar

References

2018 novels
Fiction set in the 21st century
Bosnia and Herzegovina literature
Novels set in Bosnia and Herzegovina